René Aleman (23 November 1913 – 1989) was a French weightlifter. He competed in the men's lightweight event at the 1948 Summer Olympics.

Personal life
Aleman enlisted in the French Armed Forces in 1936. During the Second World War, he was captured by German forces in June 1940 in the Battle of France, but escaped custody two years later.

References

External links
 

1913 births
1989 deaths
French male weightlifters
Olympic weightlifters of France
Weightlifters at the 1948 Summer Olympics
People from El Biar
French military personnel of World War II
French prisoners of war in World War II
World War II prisoners of war held by Germany
French escapees
Escapees from German detention
Migrants from French Algeria to France